Tupperware is an American home products line that includes preparation, storage, and serving products for the kitchen and home. In 1942, Earl Tupper developed his first bell-shaped container; the brand products were introduced to the public in 1946.

Tupperware develops, manufactures, and internationally distributes its products as a wholly owned subsidiary of its parent company Tupperware Brands; as of 2007, it was sold by means of approximately 1.9 million direct salespeople on contract.

In 2013, the top marketplace for Tupperware was Indonesia, which topped Germany as the second. Indonesia's sales in 2013 were more than $200 million.

Tupperware has refused to cease operations, hiring and investment in Russia following the 
Russian invasion of Ukraine (2022–present).

Company history

Tupperware was developed in 1946 by Earl Tupper (1907–1983) in Leominster, Massachusetts. He developed plastic containers to be used in households to contain food and keep them airtight, which featured a then-patented "burping seal". Tupper had already invented the plastic for Tupperware in 1938, but the product succeeded with the emergence of the "sale through presentation" idea, held in a party setting.

Tupperware developed a direct marketing strategy to sell products known as the Tupperware party. The Tupperware party enabled women of the 1950s to earn an income while keeping their focus in the domestic domain. The "party plan" model relies on characteristics generally assumed of housewives (e.g., party planning, hosting a party, sociable relations with friends and neighbors).

Brownie Wise (1913–1992) recognized Tupperware's potential as a commodity. She realized that she had to be creative and therefore started to throw these Tupperware parties. Wise, a former sales representative of Stanley Home Products, developed the strategy. As a result, Wise was made vice president of marketing in 1951. Wise soon created Tupperware Parties Inc.

During the early 1950s, Tupperware's sales and popularity exploded, thanks in large part to Wise's influence among women who sold Tupperware, and some of the famous "jubilees" celebrating the success of Tupperware ladies at lavish and outlandishly themed parties. At a time when women came back from working during World War II only to be told to "go back to the kitchen", Tupperware was known as a method of empowering women and giving them a toehold in the postwar business world. The tradition of Tupperware's "Jubilee" style events continues to this day, with rallies being held in major cities to recognize and reward top-selling and top-recruiting individuals, teams, and organizations.

Tupperware spread to Europe in 1960 when Mila Pond hosted Tupperware parties in Weybridge, England, and other locations around the world. At the time, a strict dress code was required for Tupperware ladies, with skirts and stockings (tights) worn at all times, and white gloves often accompanying the outfit.  A technique called "carrot calling" helped promote the parties: representatives would travel door-to-door in a neighborhood and ask housewives to "run an experiment" in which carrots would be placed in a Tupperware container and compared with "anything that you would ordinarily leave them in"; it would often result in the scheduling of a Tupperware party.

Rexall, by now the owner of the Tupperware brand, sold its namesake drugstores in 1977, and renamed itself Dart Industries. Dart merged with Kraftco to form Dart & Kraft. The company demerged, with the former Dart assets renamed Premark International. Tupperware Brands was spun off from Premark in 1996; Premark was acquired by Illinois Tool Works three years later.

In 2003, Tupperware closed down operations in the UK and Ireland, citing customer dissatisfaction with their direct sales model. There has been limited importer-based distribution since then. The company announced a formal relaunch in the UK in mid-2011, and recruited UK staff, but in December the relaunch was cancelled.

In May 2018, the Israeli daily TheMarker, reported that Tupperware will withdraw from Israel leaving 2,000 agents without a job. The article attributed this decision to the regional headquarters which manages other Middle Eastern countries. Tupperware Israel relaunched in December 2020 as an online shop.

In March 2021 Tupperware closed down in the Netherlands.

In August 2022 Tupperware announced it would be leaving the New Zealand market in late 2022. 

On November 2, 2022, after publishing quarterly results, the company said its inability to maintain compliance with its credit agreement raises substantial doubt about its ability to continue as a going concern. The stock value dropped more than 40%.

Tupperware is now sold in almost 100 countries, after peaking at more than a hundred in 1996.

Tupperware parties

Tupperware is still sold mostly through a party plan, with rewards for hosts and hostesses. In some countries like New Zealand, products can be purchased online without a salesperson. A Tupperware party is run by a Tupperware "consultant" for a host or hostess who invites friends and neighbors into their home to see the product line. Tupperware hosts and hostesses are rewarded with free products based on the level of sales made at their party. Parties also take place in workplaces, schools, and other community groups.

To stay in touch with its sales force, Tupperware published the monthly magazine Tupperware Sparks. The magazine had snapshots of saleswomen posing with awards and recognition for high sales. To avoid spending money on advertising, Tupperware created events that attracted free publicity.

In most countries, Tupperware's sales force is organized in a tiered structure with consultants at the bottom, managers and star managers over them, and next various levels of directors, with Legacy Executive Directors at the top level. In recent years, Tupperware has eliminated distributorships in the US.

The multi-level marketing strategy adopted by Tupperware has been criticized as manipulative.  Statistics released by Tupperware in 2018 showed that 94% of its active distributors remained on the lowest level of the pyramid, with average gross earnings of $653.

In recent years, Tupperware in North America has moved to a new business model which includes more emphasis on direct marketing channels and eliminated its dependency on authorized distributorships. This transition included selling through Target stores in the US and Superstores in Canada with disappointing results. Tupperware states this hurt direct sales. In countries with a strong focus on marketing through parties (such as Germany, Australia, and New Zealand), Tupperware's market share and profitability continue to decline.

In many countries, Tupperware products have a lifetime guarantee. The company is best known for its plastic bowls and storage containers. In recent years it has expanded into stainless steel cookware, cutlery, chef's knives, and other kitchen gadgets. After experiencing a slump in sales and public image in the mid-1990s, the company created several new product lines to attract a younger market.

In some countries including Belgium, Australia, Ireland, and the US Tupperware markets its parties and career opportunities through mall kiosks.

In China, Tupperware products are sold through franchised "entrepreneurial shopfronts", of which there were 1,900 in 2005, due to pyramid selling laws enacted in 1998. The Chinese characters 特百惠 are used as the brand name, and translate as "hundred benefit".

An episode of All in the Family featured Edith hosting a Tupperware party.

Gender aspects and cultural influence

Feminist views vary regarding the Tupperware format of sales through parties and the social and economic role of women portrayed by the Tupperware model. Opposing views state that the intended gendered product and selling campaign further domesticates women, and keeps their predominant focus on homemaking. The positive feminist views consider that Tupperware provided work for women who were pregnant or otherwise not guaranteed their position at work due to unequal gender laws in the workplace. The company promoted the betterment of women and the opportunities Tupperware offered women. The negative view includes the restriction of women to the domestic sphere and limiting the real separation between running the household and a career. The emergence of Tupperware in the American market created a new kind of opportunity for an underrepresented labor demographic: women, and especially suburban housewives.

See also

 Gold party
 Hana Cobi Plastic aka Lock & Lock
 Newell Rubbermaid
 Tub (container)

References

Further reading
 Charles Duhigg, "Why Short Sellers Want to Crash the Tupperware Party," New York Times, Nov. 17, 2006.
 Elayne Rapping, "Tupperware and Women", Radical America, vol. 14, no. 6 (Nov.–Dec. 1980), pp. 39–49.

External links
 Official website
 "Tupperware!"  program from PBS' American Experience, 2005.
 George J. Yarbrough, The Wonderful World of Tupperware. Orlando, FL: United Film Productions, n.d. [c. 1964]. Public Relations film.

1948 establishments in Massachusetts
American brands
American inventions
Brands that became generic
Containers
Direct sales companies
Food storage
Kitchenware brands
Manufacturing companies established in 1948
Personal selling
Plastic brands
Products introduced in 1948
Plastics companies of the United States
Companies based in Orlando, Florida